Beinn Mhòr is the highest mountain on the Cowal Peninsula west of Loch Eck in Argyll and Bute, Scotland. It has a high topographic prominence to height ratio and consequently commands a good all round view.

Beinn Mhor is within the Loch Lomond and The Trossachs National Park. To its east, Benmore Botanic Garden makes use of the lower slopes, and includes an outdoor centre in Benmore House.

Ascents 
Beinn Mhòr is most frequently and probably most easily ascended from the south, via the end of the public road into Glen Massan. From here, there is a short hike to Glen Massan, followed by about 400 metres of ascent up forestry tracks and paths, from which the climber eventually emerges onto the open hillside. At this point, the climber returning by the same route should note the position, as there are no paths above this point and entering the forest by any other point could mean getting lost in steep and thickly forested terrain. Despite the lack of paths, the upper slopes are gentle and mostly short grass which provide easy ascent to the summit.

An alternative longer route ascends from the car park of Benmore Botanic Garden, with a track leading up to the steep grassy slopes of A' Cruach and the secondary tops of Creachan Beag and Creachan Mòr to a wide shoulder leading to the summit of  Beinn Mhòr itself.

References 

 The Corbetts and Other Scottish Hills, (SMC Guide)

External links
 The Loch Lomond and Trossachs National Park

Marilyns of Scotland
Grahams
Mountains and hills of Argyll and Bute
Cowal